Senator Olson may refer to:

Alan Olson (born 1956), Montana State Senate
Alec G. Olson (born 1930), Minnesota State Senate
Andrew C. Olson (1866–1920), Minnesota State Senate
Conrad P. Olson (1882–1952), Oregon State Senate
Culbert Olson (1876–1962), California State Senate
Donny Olson (born 1953), Alaska State Senate
Gen Olson (born 1938), Minnesota State Senate
Howard Olson (1937–1996), Minnesota State Senate
John Olson (Minnesota politician) (1906–1981), Minnesota State Senate
Mary Olson (born 1958), Minnesota State Senate
Melvin Olson (1887–1962), Wisconsin State Senate
Obert A. Olson (1882–1938), North Dakota State Senate
Ole H. Olson (1872–1954), North Dakota State Senate
Oscar R. Olson (1869–1945), Wisconsin State Senate
Robert S. Olson (born 1969), Kansas State Senate
William Olson (1873–1931), Wisconsin State Senate

See also
Senator Olsen (disambiguation)